Roger Sellers, also known by his stage name Bayonne, is an American minimalist composer and electronic musician based in Austin, Texas, United States. After releasing three albums under his own name, Sellers changed his moniker to Bayonne, with the re-release of his most recent work, Primitives, on Mom + Pop/City Slang in 2016. Bayonne is known for creating and layering intricate loops as well as his engaging one-man live performances.

Career

Releases 
Roger Sellers, his first album as a solo artist, and 2012's 8 Songs, were self-released through Bandcamp. Moments, Sellers' 2011 release, was released via Pau Wau Records. In 2014, Sellers released Primitives via Punctum Records, which would later be reissued by Mom + Pop Music in 2016.  In November 2018, Bayonne and his record label announced via social media the upcoming release of Drastic Measures, his sophomore LP, released on February 22, 2019.

Sellers’ song “Appeals”, featured in the EA Sports game FIFA 17.

Discography
as Roger Sellers

Studio albums
Moments (2011, Pau Wau Records)
8 Songs (2012, self-released)
Primitives (2014, Punctum Records)

as Bayonne

Studio albums
Primitives (2016, re-issue on Mom + Pop Records)
Drastic Measures (2019, Mom + Pop Records)
EPs
I Know (2018, Mom + Pop Records)
Singles
 "Spectrolite" (2015, MP3, Mom + Pop Records)
 "Living Room" (2016, MP3, Mom + Pop Records)
 "Fallss" (2017, MP3, Mom + Pop Records)
 "I Know" (2017, MP3, Mom + Pop Records)
 "Is It Time" (2022, MP3, Nettwerk)
 "Solo" (2022, MP3, Nettwerk)
 "Right Thing" (2023, MP3, Nettwerk)
 "Words" (2023, MP3, Nettwerk)

References

Musicians from Austin, Texas
Living people
Year of birth missing (living people)
City Slang artists
Mom + Pop Music artists